Siphonochelus aethomorpha is a species of sea snail, a marine gastropod mollusk, in the family Muricidae, the murex snails or rock snails.

Distribution
This marine species occurs off Madagascar.

References

 Houart, R, Buge, B. & Zuccon, D. (2021). A taxonomic update of the Typhinae (Gastropoda: Muricidae) with a review of New Caledonia species and the description of new species from New Caledonia, the South China Sea and Western Australia. Journal of Conchology. 44(2): 103–147.

External links
 Houart, R. & Héros, V. (2015). New species of Muricidae Rafinesque, 1815 (Mollusca: Gastropoda) from the Western Indian Ocean. Zoosystema. 37 (3): 481-503

aethomorpha
Gastropods described in 2015